Muinonen is a Finnish surname. Notable people with the surname include:

Väinö Muinonen (1898–1978), Finnish long-distance runner
Eetu Muinonen (born 1986), Finnish footballer

See also
4665 Muinonen, a main-belt asteroid

Finnish-language surnames